The Jamboree Ward is a Brisbane City Council ward covering Jamboree Heights, Darra, Jindalee, Middle Park, Mt Ommaney, Riverhills, Seventeen Mile Rocks, Sinnamon Park, Wacol and parts of Ellen Grove and Oxley.

Councillors for Jamboree Ward

Results

References 

City of Brisbane wards